Friedheim is an unincorporated community in Apple Creek Township in northwestern Cape Girardeau County, Missouri, United States.

History
A small village in the northwest part of Apple Creek Township; German settlers arrived in the Friedheim area in the 1840s fleeing political unrest back home. These German Lutheran settlers built their own log church in 1849, which was later replaced by the current stone church in 1857.
A post office was established here in 1887 and named by the German settlers for their old home Friedheim, Germany.
Friedheim is home to Trinity Lutheran church, a member of the Lutheran Church - Missouri Synod.

Geography
Friedheim is located twenty-two miles northwest of Cape Girardeau and is three miles west of I-55 along Missouri Route KK. Arnsberg is two miles to the east and Hilderbrand is approximately one mile to the west along route KK.

References

German-American culture in Missouri
Unincorporated communities in Cape Girardeau County, Missouri
Cape Girardeau–Jackson metropolitan area
Unincorporated communities in Missouri
1840s establishments in Missouri